Van Reyper-Bond House is located in Montclair, Essex County, New Jersey, United States. The house was built in 1872 and was added to the National Register of Historic Places on January 22, 1979. The house is located on the campus of Montclair State University.

See also
National Register of Historic Places listings in Essex County, New Jersey

References

Houses on the National Register of Historic Places in New Jersey
Italianate architecture in New Jersey
Houses completed in 1872
Houses in Essex County, New Jersey
Montclair, New Jersey
National Register of Historic Places in Essex County, New Jersey
New Jersey Register of Historic Places